The Maine Discovery Museum, located in Bangor, Maine, is Maine's largest children's museum and the largest located north of Boston, Massachusetts.

It opened in 2001 in the converted Freese's Building department store following several years of planning and fundraising. Maine Discovery Museum is a member of the Association of Children's Museums.

History
In 1996, Sean Faircloth had the idea for the Maine Discovery Museum and led the project through completion of a $4.5 million facility in 2001.  Maine Discovery Museum served as a lynchpin of downtown revitalization. Then-Congressman John Baldacci said that Maine Discovery Museum “restored the heart” to downtown Bangor.  At that time, the Maine Discovery Museum was the largest children's museum outside Boston in New England.  Capital Campaign Director Martha Dudman stated, “Sean Faircloth’s determination and attention to detail is what has made this project as successful as it has been.” 

MDM boosts three floors of interactive exhibits, including its newest addition NANO, a permanent exhibit donated by NISE Network. NANO is an interactive exhibition that engages family audiences in nanoscale science, engineering, and technology. Hands-on exhibits present the basics of nanoscience and engineering, introduce some real-world applications, and explore the societal and ethical implications of this new technology. MDM was selected by the NISE Network to receive this donated exhibit valued at $50,000 in recognition of their work to educate in the field of science.

Celebrating ten years in the community, the Maine Discovery Museum was named Nonprofit of the Year in 2012 by the Bangor Region Chamber of Commerce. Also in 2012, MDM was chosen as the Grand Marshal of the city's historic Independence Day Parade and celebration and also launched its Capital Campaign. 

MDM is also a member of Bangor Arts, a group that strives to support the ever-evolving arts and cultural scene in the Bangor region.

Let's Move!
Maine Discovery Museum is a "Let's Move!" institution, partnering with the First Lady Michelle Obama's initiative to fight childhood obesity. In early 2012, the museum opted to remove all traditional vending and dining options in the museum and replace them with Sprout Healthy Vending machines offering natural and organic snacks, juices and soda as well as gluten and dairy free foods and vegan options. The change was made to kick off a new healthy kids initiative. Many exhibits within the museum focus on both gross motor and fine motor movements.

Fundraising
The largest and longest running fundraising effort of the museum is its popular Annual Auction held in the fall. Artists from across the state and beyond donate works to be auctioned to the highest bidder at the auction banquet. This event serves to not only provide support to the museum but offers recognition to museum members, supporters, staff and volunteers and their families that have help shepherd the museum through the past decade. In addition, it highlights the immensely talented artists in the state of Maine.

Current exhibits
 NANO: Discover a World You Can't See exhibit
 in-door river and nature trails
 two story tree house
 life size explorable beaver dam
 paper making studio
 two art galleries (Main Street Gallery & Snack Room Gallery)
 art studio
 recording & karaoke studio
 children's library & Good Night Moon room
 life size body journey exhibit
 life size Dino Dig Pit and Archeology Exhibit 
 Reptile & Animal Exploration Center, featuring Bearded Dragons, Corn Snakes, Crested Gecko, Hermit Crabs, and Madagascar Hissing Cockroaches
 Turtle Alley, home to several turtle and fish species
 two birthday party rooms
 puppet theatre

References

Children's museums in Maine
Museums established in 2001
Museums in Penobscot County, Maine
2001 establishments in Maine
Educational buildings in Bangor, Maine
Tourist attractions in Bangor, Maine